Jeremy Max Finer (born 20 July 1955) is an English musician, artist and composer. He was one of the founding members of The Pogues.

Life and career

Finer was born in Stoke-on-Trent, England, the son of political scientist Samuel Finer. He took a joint degree in computing and sociology at Keele University. After college, he travelled around Europe and spent some time working on a barge in France. He settled in London, where he met Shane MacGowan, Spider Stacy, and James Fearnley with whom he founded The Pogues.  He has worked in a variety of fields, including photography, film, experimental and popular music and installation.

Primarily a banjoist with the Pogues, he occasionally played other instruments including mandola, saxophone, hurdy-gurdy and the guitar. Apart from MacGowan (with whom he co-wrote several songs, including "Fairytale of New York"), Finer was the most prolific composer for the band. 

He appeared on all the band's albums until their breakup in 1996; he was one of only three original members. During that time he also appeared on MacGowan's solo album The Snake and The Levellers' self-titled release; he continued working as a musician and composer after leaving The Pogues.

On 1 January 2000, the Finer-composed Longplayer piece of music was started; this is designed to last 1000 years without ever repeating itself, and as currently implemented exists in both computer-generated and live versions. Longplayer represents a convergence of many of his concerns, particularly those relating to systems, long-durational processes and extremes of scale in both time and space.

Finer was "Artist in Residence" at the Astrophysics Sub-department of the University of Oxford between October 2003 and June 2005, making a number of works including two sculptural observatories, Landscope and The Centre of the Universe.  Finer and Hamburg-based swamp pop legend DM Bob have recorded and performed together since 2005, releasing their album Bum Steer in August of that year and co-producing the debut album by the experimental pop band Marseille Figs. He has written articles on copyright and the Creative Commons License. In July 2005, Finer won the PRS Foundation New Music Award on the basis of his proposal to build a device that will automatically "compose" a song of indeterminate length by harnessing the creative force of the weather. His proposal read:

The countryside is shot through with holes in the ground; wells, mine shafts, fissures, bunkers, ventilation holes. In this piece of music the venue is a deep shaft in which there will be placed, at different heights, bowls of different sizes and tunings pivoted about their center of gravity, the instruments. The players, the drips of water, will strike the bowls, ringing them like bells. As they fill with water their timbres will change, and the delicate equilibrium of their pivots will cause them to sway slightly, modulating the tones. Overflowing, a bowl will drip into ones below it.

Amplification will be facilitated by a tube rising up from within the shaft, into a brass horn twenty feet above the surface. Akin to the bamboo tube in the Sui-kink Tsu, the horn not only amplifies the sounds but forms a sculptural object, a focus in the landscape. The work was constructed and installed in King's Wood near Challock, Kent over the summer of 2006.

In March 2012, Mobile Sinfonia, a global composition for ringtones was launched, developed during a year spent as a non-resident artist at the University of Bath.  This piece concerns mutual invasion of soundscape via ringtones.  He later received an honorary doctorate from Bath.

He is working on a number of new projects continuing his interest in long-term sustainability and the reconfiguring of older technologies, including a series of hurdy-gurdy recordings,  Spiegelei, a spherical camera obscura featuring Finer's innovative 360-degree projection system and Supercomputer, a 5 bit mechanical sculpture which computes minimal musical scores.

References

External links
Artangel:Longplayer
Guardian article (July 2004)

1955 births
Living people
Alumni of Keele University
English banjoists
People from Stoke-on-Trent
Musicians from Staffordshire
The Pogues members
People associated with the University of Oxford
People associated with the University of Bath
English contemporary artists